This is a list of Donald mountains in Scotland by height.

This formula splits Donalds into Donald Hills and Donald Tops.  The SMC define Donald Tops as: "elevations in the Scottish Lowlands of at least 2000ft (610m) in height with a drop of at least 50ft (15.2m) between each elevation and any higher elevation. Further, elevations separated from higher elevations by a drop of less than 100ft (30.5m) are required to have "sufficient topographical merit".  In addition, the SMC define Donald Hills as being: "defined from Donald Tops, where a Hill is the highest Top with a separation of 17 units or less. A unit is either one-twelfth of a mile along a Top's connecting ridge or 50ft (30.5m) in elevation between the Top and its connecting bealach/col. The separation is the sum of these two measures."

The SMC note that: "Percy Donald's original Tables are seen as a complete entity, unlike the Munros, Corbetts and Grahams"; thus many Donalds are also Corbetts or Grahams. Percy Donald's original 1935 list recorded 133 Donalds, however since 1997, the SMC records 140 Donalds in the Scottish lowlands, split into 89 Donald Hills and 51 Donald Tops.

Climbers who climb all SMC Donalds are called Donaldists, the first being Percy Donald on 23 May 1933; a list is maintained.

Donald mountains by height

This list is from the Database of British and Irish Hills ("DoBIH") in October 2018, and are peaks the DoBIH marks as being Donalds ("D" and "DT").  The SMC does not update the list of Donalds (they are fixed), however the DoBIH also updates their measurements as more surveys are recorded, so these tables should not be amended or updated unless the entire DoBIH data is re-downloaded again.

Bibliography

DoBIH codes

The DoBIH uses the following codes for the various classifications of mountains and hills in the British Isles, which many of the above peaks also fall into:

suffixes:
= twin

See also
 List of mountains of the British Isles by height
 List of mountains of the British Isles by prominence
 Lists of mountains and hills in the British Isles
 List of mountains in Ireland
 List of Munro mountains in Scotland
 List of Murdos (mountains)
 List of Furth mountains in the British Isles
 List of Marilyns in the British Isles
 List of P600 mountains in the British Isles

Notes

References

External links
 The Database of British and Irish Hills (DoBIH), the largest database of British Isles mountains
 Hill Bagging UK & Ireland, the searchable interface for the DoBIH
 The Relative Hills of Britain, a website dedicated to mountain and hill classification

Donalds